Paydirt is an album by the American cowpunk band Dash Rip Rock, released in 1998.

Production
The album was produced by former member Fred LeBlanc, who also cowrote the songs. Kyle Melancon took over on drums, replacing Chris Luckette. It was the band's intention to make a more radio-friendly record; they had decided to pull back from national touring if Paydirt was not a success. 

The song "King Death" was written in tribute to Country Dick Montana. Tab Benoit contributed guitar to "String You Up"; "Singin' the Blues" is a cover of the Marty Robbins song.

Critical reception

The Washington Post called the album "a Dixie-fried, swamp-soaked version of NRBQ." OffBeat wrote that the band "has largely abandoned the hard rock, punkabilly and song parodies of recent years in favor of a triumphant return to their countrified pop roots." 

The Los Angeles Times wrote: "With Paydirt, this notoriously rowdy and raucous trio counterbalances its own typical tendencies by tempering the raunch with brisk smart-pop offerings and even some serious, wistful and lovely jangle-rock numbers far more redolent of R.E.M.'s sober Athens, Ga., classicism than the whiskey-drenched roadhouse mayhem Dash has been bootlegging out of New Orleans for nearly 15 years." The Times-Picayune deemed the album "a collection of mostly mid-tempo, crisp guitar pop."

Track listing

Personnel
Bill Davis - guitar, vocals
Hoaky Hickel - bass
Kyle Melancon - drums

References

1998 albums